The 1986–87 Israel State Cup (Gvia HaMedina) was the 48th season of Israel's nationwide football cup competition and the 33rd after the Israeli Declaration of Independence.

The competition was won by Maccabi Tel Aviv who have beaten Maccabi Haifa 4–3 on penalties after 3–3 draw in the final.

Results

Sixth Round

Seventh Round

Eighth Round

Round of 16

Quarter-finals

Semi-finals

Final

References
100 Years of Football 1906-2006, Elisha Shohat (Israel), 2006, pp. 271
 Maariv, 25.1.1987, Historical Jewish Press 
Completion matches Maariv, 1.2.1987, Historical Jewish Press 
Yesterday at the cup Maariv, 4.2.1987, Historical Jewish Press 
Yesterday at the cup Maariv, 8.3.1987, Historical Jewish Press 

Israel State Cup
State Cup
Israel State Cup seasons